{{DISPLAYTITLE:Tau3 Serpentis}}

Tau3 Serpentis, Latinized from τ3 Serpentis, is a G-type giant star in the constellation of Serpens.  It is approximately 410 light-years from Earth.  It has an apparent visual magnitude of approximately 6.108.

References

Serpens (constellation)
G-type giants
Serpentis, 15
Serpentis, Tau3
139074
076337
5795
Durchmusterung objects